Gullow Gjeseth (7 May 1937 – 18 January 2017) was a Norwegian military officer.

Gjeseth was born in Nærøy, and graduated from the Norwegian Military Academy in 1959.

He served as officer in the Hans Majestet Kongens Garde, and was chief of staff at the 6th Division from 1982 to 1985. From 1986 to 1990 he headed the information department of the Norwegian High Command. At the time of his retirement he held the rank of major general.

From 1996 to 2006 he edited the journal Norsk Militært Tidsskrift. He was also a researcher at the Norwegian Institute for Defence Studies, and he chaired the investigation committee of the Lillehammer affair (1998–2000). His books include Allianseforsvar i endring: 1970–2000 (2004; jointly with Jacob Børresen and Rolf Tamnes, as volume V in the five-volume series Norges forsvarshistorie), further Hæren i omveltning 1990–2005 from 2008, and Landforsvarets krigsplaner under den kalde krigen from 2011.

He resided at Eiksmarka.

References

1937 births
2017 deaths
People from Nærøy
Norwegian Military Academy alumni
Norwegian Army generals
Norwegian journal editors
Norwegian military historians